Claude Brami (born 20 December 1948 in Tunis) is a French writer, winner of the 1982  Prix des libraires. During the 1970s, he wrote a dozen detective novels under the pseudonyms Christopher Diable and Julien Sauvage.

Biography 
He was a great lover of detective novels from the age of eleven. In 1968, while still a student, he wrote his first book. La Lune du fou appeared in 1973 under the pseudonym Julien Sauvage. Fifteen police novels will follow under this pseudonym, whose series devoted to the exploits of the adventurer Bruno Campara, nicknamed the Condottiere and three novels of espionage that stage Nicolas Rone. Under the pen name Christophe Diable, he gave three detective novels: Une affaire trop personnelle, La Petite Fille au chewing-gum (un chewing-gum qui tue) and La Plus Longue Course d'Abraham Coles, chauffeur de taxi. This last title won the Grand Prix de Littérature Policière. After 1977, Brami lost interest in genre literature and, under his patronym, signed a few novels for the publishing house Denoël and Gallimard.

Claude Brami also works as a television advisor. He works on series for Victor Vicas on the first channel and for Claude Barma on the second. The author nevertheless continues to write on his typing machine every day and year round novels for one copy every three or four months, because, he says: "If I stopped , I do not know if I would have the courage to start again".

He practices assiduously tennis and martial arts: he has high grades in karate and aikido.

Works

NOvels 
1981: Le Garçon sur la colline, Gallimard, Prix des libraires
1986: La Danse d'amour du vieux corbeau, Denoël
1987: La Grande Sœur, Denoël
1990: Parfums des étés perdus, Gallimard, Prix RTL Grand Public
1994: Mon amie d'enfance, Gallimard, Prix de l'Académie Littéraire de Bretagne et des Pays de la Loire
1997: La Chance des débutants, Gallimard

Novels under the pseudonym Christopher Diable 
1973: Une Affaire trop personnelle, Denoël, ""
1974: La Petite demoiselle au chewing-gum, Denoël, "Crime-club"
1977: La Plus Longue Course d'Abraham Coles, chauffeur de taxi, Denoël, '",- Grand Prix de Littérature Policière

Novels under the pseudonym Julien Sauvage

Séries "Condottiere" 
1974: Le Condottiere, Fleuve noir, "" #1084
1974: Le Condottiere et la blonde qui pleurait, Fleuve noir, "Spécial Police #1115
1975: Le Condottiere et le Chasseur de scalps, Fleuve noir, "Spécial Police" #1191
1977: Le Condottiere et le Tueur au monocle, Fleuve noir, "Spécial Police" #1348

Spying series Nicolas Rone 
1976: Le Jeu du scorpion, Fleuve noir, "" #1282
1976: Le Tueur d'Amsterdam, Fleuve noir, "Espionnage" #1299
1977: Coup pourri, Fleuve noir, "Espionnage" #1352

Other novels 
1973: La Lune du fou, Fleuve noir, "Spécial Police" #1013
1973: Portes closes, Fleuve noir, "Spécial Police" #1033

Sources 
 .

External links 
 Claude Brami on Babelio
 Claude Brami  on Éditions Gallimard
 Le garçon sur la colline on Folio,  

20th-century French non-fiction writers
20th-century French male writers
21st-century French non-fiction writers
French screenwriters
Prix des libraires winners
French crime fiction writers
1948 births
Living people